The National Swimming Pool Foundation (NSPF) was a United States 501(c)(3) non-profit organization, most known for selling the Certified Pool Operator certification, amongst many other less known products. The Certified Pool Operator certification is accepted almost worldwide as a credential that governments consider a quasi licenser to professionally care for and maintain swimming pools in recreational water environments. In 2019, the NSPF completed a merger with the Association of Pool & Spa Professionals (APSP), founding the Pool & Hot Tub Alliance (PHTA).  

NSPF itself is primarily a publishing company; they sell books and online courses through over one thousand instructors authorized to teach their courses worldwide. In 2003 Tom Lachocki was named APSP CEO.  Lachocki was formerly a Biolab/Chemtura chemist who holds eight US patents on chemical processes many of which have a direct or indirect application to swimming pools or "recirculating bodies of water". Lachocki took the Certified Pool Operator handbook from a black-and-white hand-sketched manual to a full-color matter-of-fact textbook.

Though for many years the Certified Pool Operator certification was the only certification for someone wishing to work in the pool industry, the CDC now recognizes at least seven similar pool operations courses.

References

Swimming organizations
Organizations established in 1963
1963 establishments in the United States